The 2007 CHA Men's Ice Hockey Tournament was played between March 9 and March 11, 2007 at the 95KGGO Arena in Des Moines, Iowa. By winning the tournament, Alabama-Huntsville received College Hockey America's automatic bid to the 2007 NCAA Men's Division I Ice Hockey Tournament.

Format
The tournament featured three rounds of play. In the first round, the fourth and fifth ranked seeds, Wayne State and Alabama-Huntsville, played for entry into the semifinals, to which the top three seeds received byes. The winners of the two semifinal games then played for the championship on March 11, 2007, with the winner receiving an automatic bid to the 2007 NCAA Men's Division I Ice Hockey Tournament.

Conference standings
Note: GP = Games played; W = Wins; L = Losses; T = Ties; PTS = Points; GF = Goals For; GA = Goals Against

Bracket

Note: * denotes overtime period(s)

Tournament awards

All-Star team
Goaltender: Blake MacNicol (Alabama-Huntsville)
Defensemen: Rob Cowan (Robert Morris), Mike Salekin (Alabama-Huntsville)
Forwards: Sean Berkstresser (Robert Morris), Chris Margott (Robert Morris), Kevin Morrison (Alabama-Huntsville)

MVP
David Nimmo (Alabama-Huntsville)

References

External links
College Hockey America tournament history

CHA Men's Ice Hockey Tournament
Cha Men's Ice Hockey Tournament
College sports in Iowa